eTrice is a CASE-Tool for the development of real-time software. It is an official Eclipse project.

The software architecture tooling eTrice is implementing the domain specific language Real-Time Object-Oriented Modeling ROOM. It provides code generators for C, C++ and Java. Each release is accompanied with tutorials and a training is provided.

Since ObjecTime Developer went out of support, eTrice is the only remaining implementation of ROOM.

Literature 
 Bran Selic, Garth Gullekson, Paul T. Ward: Real-Time Object-Oriented Modeling. John Wiley & Sons Inc, New York 1994,

References

External links 
 eTrice project at eclipse.org

Real-time technology
Eclipse (software)
Software using the Eclipse license